Ronan McDonald (born 30 June 1992) is an Australian cricketer. He played in two first-class matches for Queensland in 2013. On 6 January 2022, McDonald was added to the Brisbane Heat squad for the 2021–22 Big Bash League season after 12 players were ruled out with COVID-19. He made his Twenty20 debut later the same day, for the Brisbane Heat.

See also
 List of Queensland first-class cricketers

References

External links
 

1992 births
Living people
Australian cricketers
Brisbane Heat cricketers
Queensland cricketers
Cricketers from Brisbane